Pristimantis fetosus is a species of frog from the family Strabomantidae.
It is endemic to Colombia. Its natural habitats are tropical moist montane forests and rivers. It is threatened by habitat loss.

References

fetosus
Endemic fauna of Colombia
Amphibians of Colombia
Amphibians of the Andes
Amphibians described in 1998
Taxonomy articles created by Polbot